The posterior nasal spine is part of the horizontal plate of the palatine bone of the skull. It is found at the medial end of its posterior border. It is paired with the corresponding palatine bone to form a solid spine. It is the attachment of the uvula muscle.

Structure 
The posterior nasal spine is found at the medial end of the posterior border of the horizontal plate of the palatine bone of the skull.

Function 
The posterior nasal spine is the attachment of the uvula muscle.

Clinical applications 
The posterior nasal spine is an important cephalometric landmark.

Additional images

See also 
 anterior nasal spine

References

External links 
 

Bones of the head and neck